Pauline Dai Turgeon (October 9, 1890 – date of death unknown) was a Canadian stage actress.

Biography
She was born on October 9, 1890 in Ottawa, Ontario, Canada to Charles Edward Turgeon and Maud Higginson divorced Charles Belmont Davis after seven years of marriage (he died in 1926).

She married Charles Belmont Davis (1866-1926), the brother of Richard Harding Davis, in London in January 1914; she was 24, he was 48. They divorced in 1921.

Productions
The Girl from Montmartre (1912)
Over the River (1912)

References

External links

1890 births
Canadian stage actresses
20th-century Canadian actresses
Year of death missing